Nisha Rawal (born 11 September 1995) is a Nepalese taekwondo practitioner who has qualified to compete at the 2016 Summer Olympics being held in Rio de Janeiro, Brazil.

Personal life
Rawal was born on 11 September 1995 in Nepal. She studies at Tribhuvan University of Nepal in Kathmandu.

Taekwondo
Rawal won a gold medal at the 2014 Mt Everest International Open Taekwondo Championships, held in her home country. She defeated India's Priyanka 21–0 in the final of the women's below-76 kg weight division. She was selected to represent Nepal at the 2014 Asian Games, held in Incheon, South Korea. In the women's heavyweight event she was defeated 11–4 in the quarterfinals by Wang Junnan of Macau.

She competed at the 2015 Summer Universiade games held in Gwangju, South Korea. In the round of 32 of the women's +73 kg event she was defeated 14–2 by Niu Lulu of China.

In January 2015 Rawal was selected as one of six Nepalese athletes to receive funding of $670 (£440/€560) a month from the Nepal Olympic Committee as part a Rio Olympic Scholarship programme. In April 2016 she was named taekwondo player of the year by the Nepal National and International Players Association.
She traveled to Manila in the Philippines to take part in the 2016 Asian Taekwondo Olympic Qualification Tournament but was beaten 9–0 in her first bout by Kirstie Elaine Alora of the Philippines.
 
In May 2016 Rawal was one of four athletes offered a wildcard by the Tripartite Commission to compete at the 2016 Summer Olympics due to be held in Rio de Janeiro, Brazil. She will represent Nepal in the women's over 67 kg event.

References

External links
 

Living people
1995 births
Sportspeople from Kathmandu
Nepalese female taekwondo practitioners
Tribhuvan University alumni
Taekwondo practitioners at the 2014 Asian Games
Taekwondo practitioners at the 2016 Summer Olympics
Taekwondo practitioners at the 2018 Asian Games
Asian Games competitors for Nepal
Olympic taekwondo practitioners of Nepal
21st-century Nepalese women